Petr Novák (born 7 October 1967 in Havlíčkův Brod) is a Czech ice hockey coach, who coached the Czech national team at the 2019 IIHF Women's World Championship.

References

External links
Petr Novák career statistics at EliteProspects.com

1967 births
Living people
Czech ice hockey coaches
Sportspeople from Havlíčkův Brod